Bepour is a nearly extinct Papuan language of Madang Province, Papua New Guinea.

References

Kumil languages
Languages of Madang Province
Endangered Papuan languages
Severely endangered languages